Sakthi T. K. Krishnasamy (1913-1987) was a veteran Tamil drama author, celebrated screenwriter and lyricist in Tamil films from the 1950s through the 1970s. He mostly wrote stories, screenplay and dialogue for films starring M. G. Ramachandran and Sivaji Ganesan. He has authored historical, mythological and social Tamil films spanning over 3 decades. He was considered one of the best film script writers of Tamil Cinema, and was hailed as such by noted screenwriters like C. N. Annadurai and M. Karunanidhi publicly. His most acclaimed works are Veerapandiya Kattabomman and Karnan.

Career 

Sakthi Krishnasamy began his literary career as a playwright and ran his own drama troupe called Sakthi Nataka Sabha. His first drama was staged at the Nagapattinam Baby Theatre and from then on he continued to write a wide variety of plays. Bhayankari was a James-Bond type thriller, Thozhan was about friendship and betrayal, while Vidhi was a love story.  He was one of the earliest to have three different stages set up and when the scene was over in one the action would shift to another stage by the side. He also wrote popular historical dramas such as Noorjehan, Chanakyan Sabatham and Maveeran Ceasar, which were staged many times as housefull shows. One of his another most popular play was Kaviyin Kanavu. Sakthi's plays were so popular that the Railways ran "Sakthi" special trains from Trichy to Nagapattinam and Trichy to Kumbakonam when they were staged. Many artistes from his drama troupe like Sivaji Ganesan, M. N. Nambiar, V. K. Ramasamy, S. V. Subbiah and A. P. Nagarajan went on to become popular actors in the Tamil film industry. The troupe consisted of about 60 members. Every member of the cast had to learn the lines of all characters in the plays as they played different roles every day. Though Sakthi himself trained the actors in acting and dialogue delivery skills, his troupe also employed professional dance masters, music teachers and fight masters to train the actors to be versatile in those artistic skills too. Sivaji Ganesan was cast as a villain in the play Vidhi. Upon watching his excellent acting skills in that play, as a hero in another drama, and as the lady character lead in Noorjehan drama, Mr. Perumal Mudaliar, who came to watch these plays told Sakthi that he has found the hero for Parasakthi film and got him cast in that highly successful film. M. N. Nambiar, another prominent actor of the troupe also made his breakthrough into films after his performance in one of the plays impressed a producer 

Sakthi Krishnasamy first wrote Veerapandiya Kattabomman as a stage play in 1957. The play was staged all over Tamil Nadu and received critical acclaim and commercial success. It was made into a highly successful film two years later, with Sivaji Ganesan in the lead and Sakthi Krishnasamy handling the script and dialogues. Sakthi Krishnasamy's powerful dialogues played a large part in its success. The film won awards in the Second Afro-Asian Film Festival at Cairo (1960) for best acting, music and a special jury award. Another epic Tamil film Karnan, which he wrote was a classic blockbuster. In Tamil movie industry, his Veerapandiya Kattabomman film dialogues are still used as aspiring actors' auditioning test script. Many of the other M.G.R and Sivaji Ganesan's films for which Sakthi Krishnasamy wrote the story, screenplay and dialogues, were box office hits.

Apart from writing screenplays for many popular Tamil films, he was also a lyricist for a number of movies in the 60s.

He was a Gandhian, who Patron for more than 30 years for the Mahatma Gandhi Library in Saidapet for the economically weak and helped it grow from 20 books to 20,000 books in his lifetime. He died after a brief illness on 8 November 1987.

Notable filmography 
Velaikaran (1952)
 Ambikapathy (1957)
 Veerapandiya Kattabomman (1959)
 Thozhan (1960)
 Aalukkoru Veedu (1960)
 Sangilidevan (1960)
 Periya Idathu Penn (1963)
 Kungumam (1963)
 Karnan (1964)
 Panakkara Kudumbam (1964)
 Arunagirinathar (1964)
 Padagotti (1964)
 Panam Padaithavan (1965)
 Enga Veettu Pillai (1965)
 Nee! (1965)
 Parakkum Paavai (1966)
 Thanga Surangam (1969)
Sorgam (1970)
 Dharmam Engey  (1972)
 Ponnunjal (1973)
 Ennai Pol Oruvan (1978)
 Punniya Boomi (1978)

Awards 
 Kalaimamani Award from Tamil Nadu State Government
 Best (Tamil) Film Dialogues Writer award given by Government of India for the film Karnan

Further reading 
 https://www.hindutamil.in/news/supplements/hindu-talkies/776135-march-11-shakti-krishnasamy-109th-birthday-powerful-writing-1.html

References

Bibliography 
 

Indian male screenwriters
Indian lyricists
1913 births
1987 deaths
People from Thanjavur
Screenwriters from Tamil Nadu
20th-century Indian dramatists and playwrights
Tamil-language lyricists
Tamil screenwriters
20th-century Indian male writers
20th-century Indian screenwriters